The 2011–12 LEN Champions League is the 49th edition of the Europe men's premier water polo competition. This also would become the first season with the new name of the LEN Champions League with the former name being called the Euroleague which had been the name of the competition since 2003.

29 teams competed in the edition with three quarters of those playing in qualifying as they joined the eight teams in the group stage. From there, the top two teams of each group qualified to the knockout stage with the final four round being played in Oradea. In the final, Pro Recco from Italy took out their seventh title defeating Croatian club, VK Primorje 11–8. Third place was fellow Croatian club HAVK Mladost who defeated Vasas SC from Hungary in the bronze medal playoff.

Group stage

Group A

Group B

Group C

Group D

Quarterfinal round

Final Four (Oradea)

Semi-finals

Third place

Final

Final standings

LEN Champions League seasons
Champions League
LEN
LEN

Awards